KTX Family Card is the loyalty program and membership card of Korail. This card is issued by Korail Networks, subsidiary of Korail.

History 
In the 1980s, the National Railroad Administration started to issue Railroad Membership Cards. This membership card only had a 10-digit membership number on it, this type of card is widely used until 1998. In 1998, quick-ticket machines and a new membership card with a magnetic strip were introduced. Although the quick-ticket machine had many benefits, the machine and new card were not widely used. The current version of KTX Family Card with IC chip (Smart card) was introduced in 2004.

Benefits 
 5% mileage for the money spent on rail ticket
 Mybi·T-money transportation card service (X-cash, a part of KS transportation card system. All Mybi area and Seoul Subway, Buses, AREX accepts this card.)
 e-ticket service (X-ticket, 1% discount)
 ‘SMS Ticket’ service (1% discount)
 self-printing ‘Home Ticket’ service (1% discount)
 ticket home delivery service
 free admission for the Railroad Museum of Korea, and KTX Family Lounge in selected station

See also 
Korail

External links 
Official Homepage
on-line reserve

Customer loyalty programs
Contactless smart cards
Fare collection systems in South Korea
Korea Train Express